John E. Burns   was a professional baseball player who played first base in the Major Leagues in 1884.

External links

1861 births
Major League Baseball first basemen
Baltimore Orioles (AA) players
Baltimore Monumentals players
19th-century baseball players
Jersey City Skeeters players
Year of death missing
Baseball players from New York (state)